Civil and political rights are a class of rights ensuring things such as the protection of peoples' physical integrity; procedural fairness in law; protection from discrimination based on gender, religion, race, sexual orientation, etc.; individual freedom of belief, speech, association, and the press; and political participation.

Civil rights may also refer to:

Legal Concepts
 Legal rights are rights that are bestowed by nations on those within their jurisdiction; they are sometimes also called civil rights in common law jurisdictions. Contrast with natural rights or human rights, which many scholars claim that individuals have by nature of being born
 Civil rights, in civil law jurisdictions, are rights or powers which can be exercised under civil law, which includes things such as the ability to contract.  In civil law jurisdictions, lawsuits between private parties for things such as breach of contract or a tort are usually expressed in terms of infringement of a civil right

U.S. Politics
 Civil rights movement, the social movement in the United States
 Civil liberties in the United States, the unalienable rights retained by U.S. citizens per the U.S. Constitution.